Ina, Kapatid, Anak may refer to :

 Ina, Kapatid, Anak, a 1979 film directed by Lino Brocka
 Ina, Kapatid, Anak (TV series), a Philippine drama series
 Ina, Kapatid, Anak (soundtrack), a soundtrack for the Philippine series of the same name